Hammarby IF Fotbollförening, commonly known as Hammarby IF, Hammarby Fotboll or simply Hammarby ( or, especially locally), is a women's football club from Stockholm founded in 1970.

Hammarby play their home games at Hammarby IP (also called Kanalplan) in the Södermalm district of Stockholm, and occasionally at Zinkensdamms IP and Tele2 Arena.

Competing in Sweden's first tier, Damallsvenskan, Hammarby are placed fifth in the all-time Damallsvenskan table, and has won the Swedish championship once, in 1985.

The club's colours are green and white, which is reflected in its crest and kit.

Since 2016, the club has been affiliated with Hammarby Fotboll, a men's team in Allsvenskan, and is a member of the Stockholms Fotbollförbund through its parent club.

History

1970–1984: Establishment of football club

The team was established in 1970, as a section under multi-sports club Hammarby IF, making it one the pioneers in Swedish women's football. Christer Molander is credited as being the founding force behind the establishment of a women's team within the club, and he also worked as head coach for the first five years. In 1973, he also coached the Swedish national team in their first ever official international game, a 0–0 home draw against Finland. Four players from Hammarby took part in the historical fixture: Gun Hellestig, Ingalill Arvling, Birgitta Johansson and Ann Jansson. About a year later, on 26 July 1974, Jansson would score Sweden's first ever international goal in a 0–1 away win against the same opponent, Finland.

From her debut in 1972 until in her retirement in 1984, Jansson was Hammarby's undisputed star player. In total, she scored 864 goals in 642 appearances as a forward, a club record. She led her side to five Swedish championship finals, but Hammarby lost all of them: to Jitex BK in 1974, Jakobsbergs GoIF in 1977, Sunnanå SK in 1982, and Öxabäcks IF in both 1978 and 1983. An other driving force behind Hammarby's success was Gunilla Paijkull. After five seasons as a player, she took over as head coach in 1977, a role she held for four years.

1985–1999: First championship title
In 1985, Hammarby won their first Swedish championship title, beating GAIS in the final by 7–2 on aggregate. Hammarby forward Anette Nilsson became the league's top scorer with 19 goals.

One of the most renowned Swedish players, Pia Sundhage joined the club in 1986, but left after one season only to return in 1990. In 1994, she took over as player-coach and immediately led Hammarby to silverware. Although the club finished as runner-up in Damallsvenskan, they won Svenska Cupen through a 2–1 win against Gideonsbergs IF in the final. In 1995, Hammarby defended its cup title through a 1–0 final win against Älvsjö AIK. Previously, the team had been the cup's runner-up in its first three editions (1981–83).

In 1999, Hammarby IF was reorganized when all the underlying sections got separated into an umbrella organization, with Hammarby IF DFF being founded.

2000–: Yo-yo club and attendance record
The team declined from 2005 and in 2011 it was relegated to First Division for the first time. Before its relegation it was one of only two teams (the other one being FC Rosengård) to have played all 24 editions of the Damallsvenskan to date since the competition's foundation in 1988.

In modern years, Hammarby has been a typical yo-yo club. They finished the 2014 Elitettan season in 2nd place & gained promotion back to the Damallsvenskan. However, they enjoyed a short stint in the top tier getting relegated in 2015. In 2016, the club once again gained a promotion from the second tier.

Before the start of the 2017 season, the side merged with Hammarby IF Fotboll, which previously only included the men's division.

On 10 October 2021, Hammarby IF set a new record attendance of 18,537 in Damallsvenskan, in a 4–1 home win against fierce rivals AIK played at Tele2 Arena.

Players

First-team squad

Notable players

List criteria:
 player has made more than 200 Damallsvenskan appearances for the club, or
 player has scored more than 50 Damallsvenskan goals for the club, or
 player has won Diamantbollen, or 
 player is a member of the Swedish football Hall of Fame.

Technical staff

Results and attendances
In recent seasons Hammarby have had the following results and average attendances:

Honours

Domestic
 Swedish Champions
 Winners (1): 1985

League
 Damallsvenskan:
 Champions (1): 1985
 Runners-up (1): 1994
 Elitettan:
 Runners-up (3): 2014, 2016, 2020

Cups
 Swedish Cup:
 Champions (2): 1994, 1995
 Runners-up (3): 1981, 1982, 1983

European
 Menton Tournament:
 Champions (1): 1986

Futsal
 Swedish Champions
 Champions (2): 1995, 2000

Footnotes

References

Notes

External links 
Hammarby IF Damfotboll official site 

 
Football clubs in Stockholm
Women's football clubs in Sweden
1970 establishments in Sweden
Association football clubs established in 1970